William S. Bishop (ca. 1804 - June 6, 1863 Rochester, Monroe County, New York) was an American lawyer and politician from New York.

Life
He was a member of the New York State Assembly (Monroe Co.) in 1839.

He was District Attorney of Monroe County from 1847 to 1850. On February 25, 1851, he married Ann Cornelia Rochester (1808–1893), daughter of Assemblyman Nathaniel Rochester (1752–1831).

He was a member of the New York State Senate (27th D.) in 1854 and 1855.

He died of pneumonia, and was buried at the Mount Hope Cemetery, Rochester. His widow married Seth M. Gates in 1867.

Sources
The New York Civil List compiled by Franklin Benjamin Hough (pg. 137f, 222, 259 and 376; Weed, Parsons and Co., 1858)
Rochester genealogy at Monroe County NY genealogy

1800s births
1863 deaths
Members of the New York State Assembly
New York (state) state senators
Politicians from Rochester, New York
New York (state) Whigs
19th-century American politicians
County district attorneys in New York (state)
Burials at Mount Hope Cemetery (Rochester)
Deaths from pneumonia in New York (state)
Lawyers from Rochester, New York
19th-century American lawyers